Quiller is a fictional spy created by English novelist Elleston Trevor.

Quiller is also a surname and given name, and may refer to:

Andrew Quiller, pen name of Kenneth Bulmer (1921–2005), British author, primarily of science fiction
Arthur Quiller-Couch (1863–1944), British writer, who published under the pen name of Q
John Quiller Rowett (1874–1924), British businessman in the spirits industry
Mabel Quiller-Couch (1866–1924), English editor, compiler and children's writer
Richard Quiller Couch, (1816–1863), British naturalist
William Quiller Orchardson (1832–1910), Scottish portraitist and painter of domestic and historical subjects

See also
Quiller (TV series), a British television series featuring the Elleston Trevor character
The Quiller Memorandum, a 1966 film adaptation of the Trevor novel The Berlin Memorandum

See also
Aquiller
Quill (disambiguation)
Quilling
Qullar (disambiguation)